Gare du Nord means "North Station" in the French language, and may refer to:

Transport 

Belgium
 Gare du Nord, local name for Gare de Bruxelles-Nord, railway station in Brussels, Belgium
 a Brussels Metro stop of the same name at the station

France
 Gare du Nord, local name for Gare d'Amiens, Amiens, France
 Gare du Nord, officially Gare de Paris-Nord, Paris, the largest railway station in Europe
 Gare du Nord, the busiest Paris Métro station
 Gare du Nord, a former station on Paris Métro Line 5, today a training center 
 Gare de Metz-Nord, Metz
 Gare de Mulhouse-Nord, Mulhouse

Switzerland
 Corcelles-Nord railway station
 Pully-Nord railway station
 Vaulruz-Nord railway station, Vaulruz

Other 

 Gare du Nord, a French film by Claire Simon (2013)
 Gare du Nord, a street name in Amsterdam-Noord, Netherlands
 Gare du Nord, a Dutch/Belgian jazz band

See also

 
 North Station (disambiguation)
 Estación del Norte (disambiguation)
 Nordbahnhof (disambiguation)